This is a list of episodes of the animated television series Hi Hi Puffy AmiYumi, who which is created by former Cartoon Network's executive Sam Register. (Episodes are in order of airing, with seasonal number, and all premiere dates are in the United States.)

Series overview

Episodes

Pilot (2003) 
Hi Hi Puffy AmiYumi had an unaired pilot episode. Sam Register pitched the idea of Puffy AmiYumi having their own television series on Cartoon Network, and the studio Renegade Animation developed a test short on April 22, 2003 in hopes of swaying the channel to greenlit their show's production. Bits and pieces of it were shown in non-full version as a preview on Cartoon Network DVDs and VHS tapes, and a full preview of the pilot was made available on the Teen Titans DVD (for its first season), albeit as a short promo. The entire pilot was found by series' director, Darrell Van Citters, and was originally uploaded to Vimeo on April 5, 2018, with reuploads being common afterwards. Despite being his creation, this was the only time Sam Register ever wrote an episode of the series.

Season 1 (2004–05)

Season 2 (2005)

Season 3 (2006)

References 

Hi Hi Puffy AmiYumi
Lists of Cartoon Network television series episodes
Hi Hi Puffy AmiYumi